Saxifraga × arendsii, the mossy saxifrage, is a perennial garden flowering plant.

Taxonomy
Saxifraga × arendsii is a group of hybrids having a complex crossbred heritage, mainly of Saxifraga exarata, Saxifraga hypnoides, Saxifraga moschata and Saxifraga rosacea.

Description
This evergreen perennial herbaceous plant has leaves arranged in a dense basal rosette. The surface-spreading, cushion to mound-forming, mossy leaves are glossy, bright green, linear, oval or oblong. Flowers are at the ends of short, strong stems. They are solitary, tiny, cup-shaped or star-shaped, and may be white, bright pink or dark red. They bloom from March to August.

Distribution
The original species plants for this hybrid are native of the far north up to the Arctic Circle.

Habitat
This hybrid mossy saxifrage grows well on rocky areas and in a rock wall crevices.

External links
Hortipedia
Perennials
Paghat

arendsii
Plant nothospecies